Dubautia arborea, the tree dubautia or Mauna Kea dubautia, is a species of flowering plant in the family Asteraceae. It is endemic to the island of Hawaii. It is a shrub or small tree. It is an endangered species that is threatened by feral grazing animals.

References

External links

IUCN Red List of All Threatened Species.
Dubautia arborea. Hawaiian Asteraceae Systematics.
NatureServe. 2015. Dubautia arborea. NatureServe Explorer. Version 7.1. NatureServe, Arlington, Virginia. Accessed September 16, 2015.

arborea
Endemic flora of Hawaii
Biota of Hawaii (island)
Taxonomy articles created by Polbot